Archolaemus ferreirai is a species of glass knifefish endemic to Brazil where it is found in the Rio Mucajaí and Rio Uraricoera in the north-eastern portions of the Amazon basin.

Etymology
The knife fish is named in honor of Efrem Ferreira (b. 1954), of the Instituto Nacional de Pesquisas da Amazônia, who was one of the collectors of the type specimen.

References

Sternopygidae
Fish of South America
Fish of Brazil
Taxa named by Richard Peter Vari
Taxa named by Carlos David Canabarro Machado de Santana
Taxa named by Wolmar B. Wosiacki
Fish described in 2012